AMC Airlines is a charter airline based in Cairo, Egypt. It operates charter flights from Egypt's tourist destinations to Europe, regular charters to the Middle East as well as domestic flights. The airline also operates ad hoc VIP flights and military transport (for the United Nations). Its main base is Cairo International Airport, with hubs at Hurghada International Airport, Sharm el-Sheikh International Airport and Luxor International Airport.

History 
The airline was established and started operations in 1988, after the Egyptian government approved the foundation of Aircraft Maintenance in Cairo. At that time, Elsayed Saber and his family launched AMC Airlines after obtaining a license to operate worldwide passenger charter operations. It is wholly owned by Saber and his family, and has 498 employees. The airline was initially named AMC Aviation before becoming 'AMC Airlines' in 2004.

Destinations 
The majority of the airline's operations are charter flights to Europe.

Fleet 

, the AMC Airlines fleet consists of the following aircraft:

Since 2006 the airline has frequently leased Boeing 737-800s from Eurocypria. AMC historical fleet was Boeing 737-200 and Airbus A300B4.

See also
 List of airlines of Egypt

References

External links

Descriptif complet compagnie AMC Airlines

Airlines of Egypt
Airlines established in 1992
Companies based in Cairo
Egyptian companies established in 1992